Mirza Juuliet is 2017 Indian Hindi-language romantic drama film, directed by Rajesh Ram Singh and produced by Green Apple Media in association with Falansha Media Private Limited and Shemaroo Entertainment. It is a modern era retelling of the Mirza Sahiban folk story from Punjab. The film was released on 7 April 2017.

Cast
Darshan Kumar as Mirza
Pia Bajpai as Juliet
Chandan Roy Sanyal as Rajan
Priyanshu Chatterjee as Dharamraj
Hemant Kumar as Bheem
Swanand Kirkire as Veer Pandey
 Yogendra Vikram Singh as Nakul
 Rashid Siddiqui as Jailor Pathak

Soundtrack 

The soundtrack of Mirza Juuliet contains five songs composed by Krsna Solo with lyrics written by Sandeep Nath.

Marketing
The movie poster was launched on 28 February 2017 and the trailer on 7 March 2017. The first song, "Tukda Tukda" was released on 16 March 2017.

Critical reception
Reza Noorani of The Times of India gave the film a rating of 2 out of 5 and said that, "In an effort to capture the magic of the tragic love story it is inspired from, 'Mirza Juuliet' crumbles under its own ambition and becomes a cinematic tragedy instead." Saibal Chatterjee of NDTV gave the film a rating of 1 out of 5 and said that, "Mirza Juuliet is a crass, clammy and clichéd concoction that is best avoided. The single star isn't for the film. It's for Darshan Kumaar." Shubhra Gupta of The Indian Express gave the film a rating of 1/2 star out of 5 stars and said that, "This film comes stuffed with the most abominable clichés which are clearly aligned to the power structures in place. This is not a film, it is a travesty." Stutee Ghost of The Quint gave the film a rating of 1 out of 5 under the headline, "This One's So Bad, It's Truly a Tragedy".

References

External links
Mirza Juuliet on Facebook

2010s Hindi-language films
2017 films
Indian romantic drama films
Films set in Mumbai
Films about prostitution in India
2017 romantic drama films
Films scored by Krsna Solo
Films based on Indian folklore